La Radiodiffusion-Télévision Nationale du Burundi (RTNB) (Burundi National Radio and Television) is the national broadcaster of the Central African state of Burundi. Burundi National Radio and Television currently broadcasts in Kirundi, French and Swahili and English.

See also
 BeTV (Burundi)
 Media of Burundi
 2015 Burundian unrest
 Communications in Burundi

External links

Publicly funded broadcasters
Television in Burundi
Broadcasting companies of Burundi
Television channels and stations established in 1975
Radio in Burundi
State media